Green Park Village is a proposed village close to Green Park business park in Reading, Berkshire.

Proposal 
The plan for the village includes 737 homes, a station to serve the village and surrounding areas, a primary school.

References

External links 
 Official website

Suburbs of Reading, Berkshire